This is the list of Asian Games records in weightlifting. Records are maintained in each weight class for the snatch lift, clean and jerk lift, and the total for both lifts.

The weight classes on the Asian Games program were adjusted for the 1998 Games, so Asian Games records only exist based on the results during and after that.

Men

Women

See also 
List of world records in Olympic weightlifting
List of Asian records in Olympic weightlifting

External links 
 Asian Weightlifting Federation

Records
Weightlifting
Asian Games